Brooksville is a home rule-class city in Bracken County, Kentucky, in the United States. As of the 2010 census, the city's population was 642. It is the county seat of Bracken County.

The area was settled before 1800 by William and Joel Woodward and was originally known as Woodward's Crossroads. County government moved from Augusta to Woodward's Crossing in 1833 due to its more central location, although it did not become the official county seat until February 16, 1839. The legislation to formalize Woodward's Crossing as the county seat was sponsored by Senator David Brooks, and the town was renamed in his honor.

The population has remained stable since 1970, when it was 609.

Geography
Brooksville is located in central Bracken County at  (38.682144, -84.067362). Kentucky Routes 10 and 19 join in Brooksville. Route 10 leads east  to Maysville, and Route 19 leads northeast  to Augusta; both destinations are on the Ohio River. The two highways head jointly out of town to the southwest from Brooksville.

Demographics

As of the census of 2000, there were 589 people, 261 households, and 163 families residing in the city. The racial makeup of the city was 98.81% White, 0.17% African American, 1.02% from other races. Hispanic or Latino of any race were 1.02% of the population.

There were 261 households, out of which 32.2% had children under the age of 18 living with them, 39.8% were married couples living together, 18.4% had a female householder with no husband present, and 37.5% were non-families. 35.2% of all households were made up of individuals, and 25.3% had someone living alone who was 65 years of age or older. The average household size was 2.26 and the average family size was 2.93.

The population was spread out, with 27.0% under the age of 18, 5.8% from 18 to 24, 25.6% from 25 to 44, 22.2% from 45 to 64, and 19.4% who were 65 years of age or older. The median age was 38 years. For every 100 females, there were 75.3 males. For every 100 females age 18 and over, there were 70.0 males.

The median income for a household in the city was $22,321, and the median income for a family was $36,875. Males had a median income of $27,308 versus $17,500 for females. The per capita income for the city was $13,457. About 18.0% of families and 19.6% of the population were below the poverty line, including 22.5% of those under age 18 and 32.7% of those age 65 or over.

Education
 Taylor Elementary School
 Bracken County Middle School
 Bracken County High School

Brooksville  has a lending library, the Bracken County Public Library.

Notable people

 Don Galloway, actor best known for playing Detective Sergeant Ed Brown on Ironside
 Ed McClanahan, noted author, English professor and bon vivant
 Herb Moford, Major League Baseball player

References

External links
 Historical Images and Texts of Brooksville, Kentucky

Cities in Bracken County, Kentucky
Cities in Kentucky
County seats in Kentucky